A Hygrophyte (Greek  hygros = wet  + phyton = plant) is a plant living  above ground that is adapted to the conditions of abundant moisture pads of  surrounding air. These plants inhabit mainly wet and dark forests and islands darkened swamp and very humid and  floody meadows. Within the group of all types of terrestrial plants, they are at least resistant to drought.

According to the environmental attributes are a group of plants between categories hydrophytes (aquatic plants) and mesophytes  (plants in  moderate environmental conditions)
Plants living in the or moist habitats typically lack xeromorphic features.

Examples of hygrophyte's  genera 

Adoxa;
Agrostis;
Bidens;
Caltha;
Cardamine;
Carex;
Catabrosa;
Chelidonium; 
Circea;
Cyperus;
Drosera;
Equisetum;
Galium;
Glyceria;
Hymenophyllum;
Juncus;
Lythrum:
Oxalis, etc.

See also
Hydrophyte
Mesophyte
Xerophyte

References

Plant ecology